María Paz Corominas Guerín (born 2 June 1952) is a Spanish former backstroke swimmer who competed in the 1968 Summer Olympics.

Notes

References

External links
 
 
 
 

1952 births
Living people
Swimmers from Barcelona
Spanish female backstroke swimmers
Olympic swimmers of Spain
Swimmers at the 1968 Summer Olympics
Mediterranean Games medalists in swimming
Mediterranean Games gold medalists for Spain
Swimmers at the 1967 Mediterranean Games